The Bondoc Peninsula (commonly known as BonPen) is located in the southeastern part of Quezon Province in Calabarzon Region, southern part of Luzon Island, Philippines. The peninsula consists of 12 municipalities: Agdangan, Buenavista, Catanauan, General Luna, Macalelon, Mulanay, Padre Burgos, Pitogo, San Andres, San Francisco, San Narciso and Unisan, all in the 3rd Congressional District of Quezon.

Those municipalities are mostly hilly and coastal areas. It has a unique festival named BonPen Festival featuring the beautiful sites of the district's twelve towns and promoting tourism in the area. The culture and arts of the peninsula is distinct compared with other districts in Quezon province. There has been a proposal to establish a Province of Bondoc Peninsula, separating the 3rd congressional district of Quezon and forming it into a distinct province.

References

Peninsulas of the Philippines
Landforms of Quezon